Jalal Uddin Khan (25 April 1894 — 31 July 1972) was a Bengali composer of Baul Song from Kendua Upazila, Netrakona. His father's name was Shadaruddin Khan. Influenced by the songs of Baul Rashid Uddin, he started composing folk and Sufi music in 1922 and composed around 500 songs. In 2005, his songs were published in five volumes as Jalalgeetika Shamagra edited by Jatin Sarker.

Reference 

Bangladeshi culture
Bengali musicians
Bengali male poets
1972 deaths
1894 births
Bengali philosophers